Osiek  is a village in the administrative district of Gmina Lubin, within Lubin County, Lower Silesian Voivodeship, in south-western Poland.

It was the birthplace of the Protestant Reformer Kaspar Schwenkfeld von Ossig in 1490.

The village has an approximate population of 1,000.

Notable people
Caspar Schwenckfeld (1489/90–1561), German theologian, writer, and preacher

References

Osiek